The Grinch is a fictional character created by Dr. Seuss.

Grinch may also refer to:

 How the Grinch Stole Christmas!, the book by Dr. Seuss
 How the Grinch Stole Christmas! (TV special), a 1966 CBS production
 How the Grinch Stole Christmas (2000 film), a live action film
 The Grinch (film), a 2018 3D animated film
 The Grinch (video game), a 2000 video game
 Alex Grinch (born 1980), American football coach

See also 
 Gringe